Angénieux is a French manufacturer of photographic and cinematographic lenses. The main markets are cinema, television, space travel and medicine. The company is part of the Thales Group, which represents Angénieux in 48 countries. The company is headquartered in Saint-Héand, near Saint-Étienne in France.

Founded in 1935 by Pierre Angénieux, the company is established in Saint-Héand (Loire), the birthplace of its founder located near Saint-Étienne. His original specialty is the design and manufacture of precision optics for film and photography. Ousted from the amateur market in the 1960s, it refocused its activity on two productions that have made its reputation: spatial optics and zooms.

Now part of the Thales Group, Thales Angénieux — since 2017 establishment of Thales Land & Air Systems — also designs, develops and produces military optics, mainly night vision binoculars.

List of products

Optimo series lenses

Optimo Prime Series 
Available 12 models by focal length: 18, 21, 24, 28, 32, 40, 50, 60, 75, 100, 135, & 200 MM

Optimo Anamorphic 

 Optimo Anamorphic 56‑152 A2S - Standard Compact Anamorphic Zoom Lens
 Optimo Anamorphic 30‑72 A2S - Wide Angle Compact Anamorphic Zoom Lens
 Optimo Anamorphic 42-420 A2S - Version of Optimo 44-440 A2S with new image characteristics

Optimo Spherical 

 Optimo Ultra Compact 21-56 FF — wide-angle compact spherical zoom lens
 Optimo Ultra Compact 37-102 FF — standard compact spherical zoom lens
 Optimo Ultra 12x FF/VV, S35 & U35 — for long-range cinema zoom
 Optimo 45‑120mm T2.8 — Telephoto Compact Spherical Zoom Lens
 Optimo 28‑76mm T2.6 — Standard Compact Spherical Zoom Lens
 Optimo 15-40mm  T2.6 — Wide Angle Compact Spherical Zoom Lens
 Optimo 19.5‑94mm — Wide Angle Spherical Zoom Lens with Large Imaging Size
 Optimo 24-290mm T2.8 (discontinued)

Optimo Style Spherical 

 Optimo Style 25‑250 — 10x Spherical Zoom Lens
 Optimo Style 48-130 — Lightweight Compact Mid-Range Tele Zoom
 Optimo Style 30‑76 — Standard Compact Spherical Zoom Lens

Type EZ Series 

 Type EZ-1 FF/VV & S35 (Standard)
 Type EZ-2 FF/VV & S35 (Wide)

References 

Lens manufacturers
Photography companies of France
Optics manufacturing companies
Multinational companies headquartered in France